Theodore Francis Leo is an American singer and musician. He is the frontman and lead guitarist of the rock group Ted Leo and the Pharmacists, and in 2013, he and Aimee Mann formed the indie rock duo The Both.

Early life 
Born in South Bend, Indiana, Leo grew up in Bloomfield, New Jersey, where his family was from and spent many formative years in the hardcore punk scene of New York City during the 1980s and early 1990s. He graduated from Seton Hall Preparatory School in West Orange in 1988 and the University of Notre Dame in the fall of 1993 with a degree in English.

Career 

Leo was a founding member of the New York punk band Citizens Arrest in 1989. In the 1990s, Leo played in bands that included Chisel, Puzzlehead, and the Sin-Eaters.

Ted Leo and the Pharmacists was formed in 1999 in Washington, D.C. The group recorded six studio albums between 1999 and 2010. Leo has also maintained a consistent presence as a solo performer since the 1990s.

In early 2013, Leo and Aimee Mann formed a duo called The Both, after Leo had toured with Mann for several months as her supporting act. He and Mann began writing songs together, and in March 2013, the duo performed their first show together as the Both (originally formatted as the hashtag #BOTH). Their self-titled debut album, The Both, was released in April 2014.

Leo released his debut solo album The Hanged Man on September 8, 2017. The album was inspired by several years of career and personal hardships, including the loss of a daughter in 2011 due to a late-term miscarriage in which Leo's wife was forced to go into premature labor.

For the 2019 animated television film Steven Universe: The Movie, Leo collaborated with Rebecca Sugar and Stemage to write the song "Independent Together". In the film, Leo voiced the role of Steg, a fusion of Steven Universe and Greg Universe. As Steg, Leo performed "Independent Together" alongside Aimee Mann  (who reprised her role as Opal from the Steven Universe television series) and voice actress Deedee Magno Hall (as Pearl).

Family and personal life 
Leo grew up in New Jersey before moving to South Bend to attend Notre Dame, where he formed Chisel. He then moved to D.C., and briefly moved to Boston thereafter. Leo has lived in Rhode Island since 2005, and he also maintained an apartment in New York City until 2016.

Leo met his wife, musician, and visual artist Jodi Buonanno, in the late 1990s when both were touring in bands. She is credited with clapping, whistle, and background vocals on the Hearts of Oak album.

His brothers, Chris and Danny Leo, are also singer-songwriters and have been members of bands such as Native Nod, the Lapse, the Van Pelt, Vague Angels, and Holy Childhood.

Leo is a vegan, and has served as a spokesman for People for the Ethical Treatment of Animals. He has made frequent radio appearances as a contributor to programs on WFMU, such as The Best Show with Tom Scharpling.

Discography

Citizens Arrest 
Citizens Arrest cassette EP (1989, Lifetime Records)
Soaked in Others Blood 7-inch EP (2012, Painkiller Records)

Puzzlehead 
See Thru 7-inch EP (1991, Next Generation Records)

Animal Crackers 
Animal Crackers/Whipped split 7-inch EP with Whipped (1991, Sound Pollution Records)
Animal Crackers 7-inch EP (1993, Thrashing Mad Records)

Chisel 
 Chisel 7-inch single (1991, Assembly Records)
 Sunburn 7-inch EP (1994, Gern Blandsten)
 Nothing New 12-inch EP (1995, Gern Blandsten)
 8 A.M. All Day (1996, Gern Blandsten)
 Set You Free (1997, Gern Blandsten)

Hell No 
Hell No 7-inch EP (1991, Wardance)
Skin Job (1992, Wardance)

Ted Leo and the Pharmacists 
Guitar for Jodi 7-inch EP (1999, Persona Records)
tej leo(?), Rx / pharmacists (1999, Gern Blandsten)
Treble in Trouble (September 2000, Ace Fu Records)
The Tyranny of Distance (June 2001, Lookout! Records)
Hearts of Oak (February 2003, Lookout! Records)
Tell Balgeary, Balgury Is Dead EP (October 2003, Lookout! Records)
Shake the Sheets (October 2004, Lookout! Records)
Sharkbite Sessions EP (February 2005, Lookout! Records)
Living with the Living (March 2007, Touch & Go Records)
Mo' Living EP (March 2007, Touch & Go Records)
Rapid Response EP (September 2008, Touch & Go Records)
The Brutalist Bricks (March 2010, Matador Records) U.S. No. 114

The Both 
The Both (April 2014, SuperEgo Records)

Ted Leo 
The Hanged Man (September 2017, self-released)

Collaborations 
"Oh, Death" (co-written with Scott Miller) on the Game Theory album Supercalifragile (2017)
"Independent Together" (performed with Deedee Magno Hall and Aimee Mann) in Steven Universe: The Movie (2019)

Compilation appearances 
"I'm Looking Through You" on This Bird Has Flown – A 40th Anniversary Tribute to the Beatles' Rubber Soul (2005, Razor & Tie)
"Heroes" on Let All the Children Boogie: A Tribute to David Bowie (2016, Spare the Rock Records)
"In the Mean Times" as part of Kickstarter's "Election Issues" project

References

External links 

Ted Leo and the Pharmacists official website

1970 births
Living people
Musicians from South Bend, Indiana
Singers from Rhode Island
People from Narragansett, Rhode Island
Rhythm guitarists
American indie rock musicians
Singers from New Jersey
People from Bloomfield, New Jersey
Writers from South Bend, Indiana
Seton Hall Preparatory School alumni
University of Notre Dame alumni
American punk rock singers
American punk rock guitarists
Ted Leo and the Pharmacists members
The Both members
Guitarists from Indiana
Guitarists from Rhode Island
Guitarists from New Jersey
American male guitarists
21st-century American singers
21st-century American guitarists
21st-century American male singers